Natig Eyvazov (born 2 November 1970, Baku, Azerbaijani SSR) is an Azerbaijani wrestler.

References

External links
 

1970 births
Living people
Olympic wrestlers of Azerbaijan
Wrestlers at the 2000 Summer Olympics
Azerbaijani male sport wrestlers
World Wrestling Championships medalists
European Wrestling Championships medalists
20th-century Azerbaijani people
21st-century Azerbaijani people